Cherry Blossom Festival may refer to:
 National Cherry Blossom Festival in Washington, DC
 The Vancouver Cherry Blossom Festival
 Subaru Cherry Blossom Festival of Greater Philadelphia, a spring celebration
 The annual Cherry Blossom Festival at Branch Brook Park in Newark, New Jersey
 The annual Cherry Blossom Festival in San Francisco, CA (Japantown)
 International Cherry Blossom Festival in Macon, GA
 Hanami, a traditional Japanese custom of celebrating the beauty of flowers, especially cherry blossoms
 An annual festival at the Brooklyn Botanic Garden in New York

Cherry blossom festivals